The Elliotts of Newbury EoN or Elliotts EoN A.P.4 was a 1940s British four-seat touring monoplane aircraft built by Elliotts of Newbury.

Development
Elliotts of Newbury were experienced wartime glider manufacturers but at the end of World War II decided to venture into the design and production of powered aircraft. The result was the EoN A.P.4 (more commonly called the Newbury Eon, a wooden four-seat monoplane with a fixed tricycle landing gear. The design had been carried out by Aviation and Engineering Products Ltd of Feltham, Middlesex. The prototype Eon 1 registered G-AKBC powered by a  Blackburn Cirrus Minor engine first flew at Welford, Berkshire, on 8 August 1947. The aircraft, which had been designed for a more powerful engine, proved to be underpowered with the Cirrus Minor and unable to carry four people. It received a Certificate of Airworthiness in September 1947. After initial testing was completed, the prototype was modified to reflect the planned production version. The main changes were a new engine, a de Havilland Gipsy Major of 145 hp (108 kW), and a lengthened nose-wheel leg. The modified aircraft was redesignated the Eon 2.

With a surplus of ex-military trainers and liaison aircraft flooding the post-war British civil aircraft market, and a shortage of modern engines, the company decided not enter production, with the part-built second prototype remaining incomplete. Elliots continued as a glider manufacturer. The sole completed Eon aircraft was used as a glider-tug to demonstrate the company's gliders. The aircraft met its end at Lympne airfield, Kent, on 14 April 1950, when, with a glider attached the pilot started the aircraft by swinging the propeller with the aircraft's wheels not secured by chocks. The engine started, and the craft moved forward; the pilotless aircraft and the glider were damaged as the aircraft passed through a boundary hedge. The glider pilot had also abandoned his cockpit when he realised what was happening.

Variants
Eon 1
Prototype with a 100 hp (75 kW) Blackburn Cirrus Minor piston engine.
Eon 2
Prototype re-engined with a 145 hp (108kW) de Havilland Gipsy Major engine.

Specifications (Eon 2)

References

Notes

Bibliography
 
  

 The Illustrated Encyclopedia of Aircraft (Part Work 1982–1985), 1985, Orbis Publishing

1940s British sport aircraft
Newbury EoN
Single-engined tractor aircraft
Glider tugs
Low-wing aircraft
Aircraft first flown in 1947